Michael Hawkins (born 18 September 1951) is a former Australian rules footballer who played for the Geelong Football Club in the Victorian Football League (VFL).  

Hawkins is the brother of Jack and Robb Hawkins and the uncle of current Geelong player Tom Hawkins. Originally from Finley, New South Wales, he played two games for Geelong in 1973.

Hawkins won the 1977 O'Dwyer Medal in the Murray Football League.

References

External links

Living people
1951 births
Geelong Football Club players
Finley Football Club players
Australian rules footballers from New South Wales